The Geological Curators' Group (GCG) is a United Kingdom-based registered charity and a membership organisation. GCG's aims are, "to advance the education of the public in geology in particular by improving the standard of geological curation and by improving displays and information in public museums and other institutions." It is recognised by the Arts Council as one of 37 organisations in the Subject Specialist Network Programme that support, "the development of knowledge and expertise associated with specialist collections and their contribution to public engagement, education and enjoyment". The GCG is affiliated to the Geological Society of London as a specialist group, and it shares a Memorandum of Understanding with the Natural Sciences Collections Association (NatSCA) and the Society for the Preservation of Natural History Collections.

History

The inaugural meeting of the group was held on 17 May 1974 at the Geological Society's premises at Burlington House.

Publications

The Geological Curators' Group publishes a biannual academic journal, called Geological Curator, which is made available online two years after publication

Projects

The GCG is one of six organisations that is contributing to the GB3D Type Fossils Online Project, which aims to create, "a single database of the type specimens, held in British collections, of macrofossil species and subspecies found in the UK, including links to photographs (including 'anaglyph' stereo pairs) and a selection of 3D digital models."

References

Geology organizations
1974 establishments in the United Kingdom
Learned societies of the United Kingdom
Geology societies